Stefan Schnöll (born 13 March 1988) is an Austrian politician who served as a member of the National Council from November 2017 to June 2018. He is chairman of the Young People's Party. Since June 2018 he serves as state councilor for trafficking, infrastructure and sports in Salzburg. 

From 2013 to April 2017 he was a vice president of the Youth of the European People's Party. He served as secretary general of the Young People's Party under chairman Sebastian Kurz before being nominated by him as successor in May 2017.

References 

1988 births
Members of the National Council (Austria)
21st-century Austrian politicians
Austrian People's Party politicians
Politicians from Salzburg
Living people